"Picture Perfect" is a song by the American rock band Sevendust. It was released as the second single from their ninth studio album, Black Out the Sun on August 6, 2013. The song has not been performed at the band's concerts, yet. Also this was one of the earliest riffs that the band worked on their latest record.

Song meaning
John Connolly described the meaning behind the song as "Picture Perfect is talking about being wronged by somebody. But at the end of the day, it's about your own point of view. Your picture perfect point of view is the only one you have got".

Charts

Personnel
Lajon Witherspoon - lead vocals
Clint Lowery - lead guitars, backing vocals
John Connolly - rhythm guitars
Vinnie Hornsby - bass guitar
Morgan Rose - drums, backing vocals
Mike Ferretti - engineer

References

Sevendust songs
2013 singles
American hard rock songs
Songs written by Clint Lowery
Songs written by Lajon Witherspoon
2013 songs